Jason William Smith (born July 24, 1977) is an American former Major League Baseball infielder.

Career
In 1995, Smith was drafted by the Los Angeles Dodgers in the 42nd round of the 1995 Major League Baseball Draft, but did not sign. A year later, he was drafted by the Chicago Cubs in the 23rd round of the 1996 Major League Baseball Draft. He made his major league debut with the Cubs on June 17, 2001.

After stints in Tampa Bay, Detroit and Colorado, Smith was claimed in the Rule 5 Draft by Toronto in December 2006.

Smith was claimed off waivers by Arizona on May 15, 2007. He played 2 games for the Diamondbacks going 1-4 before being placed on the disabled list. On July 11, 2007, while on the disabled list, he was claimed off waivers by the Kansas City Royals, for whom he batted .188 in 2007 and .214 in 2008.

He became a free agent after the 2008 season and signed a minor league contract with the Houston Astros on January 5, 2009.

On May 10, 2009 Smith was recalled to Houston for added depth as Lance Berkman suffered a wrist injury.

Personal life
Smith's cousin, Austin Davis, plays in the NFL. He currently resides in Mobile, Alabama.

References

External links

1977 births
Living people
American expatriate baseball players in Canada
Arizona Diamondbacks players
Baseball players from Mississippi
Chicago Cubs players
Colorado Rockies players
Colorado Springs Sky Sox players
Daytona Cubs players
Detroit Tigers players
Durham Bulls players
Houston Astros players
Iowa Cubs players
Kansas City Royals players
Major League Baseball infielders
Meridian Eagles baseball players
Omaha Royals players
Rockford Cubbies players
Round Rock Express players
Tampa Bay Devil Rays players
Toledo Mud Hens players
Toronto Blue Jays players
Tucson Sidewinders players
Visalia Oaks players
West Tennessee Diamond Jaxx players
Williamsport Cubs players